The Baronial Order of Magna Charta ("BOMC") is a scholarly, charitable, and lineage society founded in 1898.  The BOMC was originally named the Baronial Order of Runnemede, but the name was subsequently changed to better reflect the organization's purposes relating to the Magna Charta and the promulgation of "freedom of man under the rule of law."

Profile 

The BOMC is a Pennsylvania 501(c)3 corporation with research, charitable, and educational purposes.  Among other things, the BOMC, and the related Magna Charta Research Foundation, seek to "encourage the study and practice of the Magna Charta, within its historical context, and the evolution of its meaning as represented in the concepts of self-determination and the rule of law."  Towards this end, the BOMC preserves documents and literature relating to the Magna Charta, sponsors scholarships and educational programs, and works with the Magna Charta Trust in the United Kingdom in furtherance of that organization's preservationist and educational goals.  Notably, since 1993, the BOMC has held a seat on the Board of Trustees of the Magna Charta Trust.  The BOMC is an approved lineage organization in the Hereditary Society Community of the United States of America.

Membership Requirements 

Membership in the BOMC may be extended to men and women of good moral character who can establish through genealogical proofs (i.e., primary or acceptable secondary sources) their descent from one of the twenty five Magna Charta Surety Barons:

William d'Aubigny, Lord of Belvoir Castle. 
Roger Bigod, Earl of Norfolk and Suffolk. 
Hugh Bigod, Heir to the Earldoms of Norfolk and Suffolk. 
Henry de Bohun, Earl of Hereford. 
Richard de Clare, Earl of Hertford. 
Gilbert de Clare, heir to the earldom of Hertford. 
John FitzRobert, Lord of Warkworth Castle. 
Robert Fitzwalter, Lord of Dunmow Castle. 
William de Fortibus, Earl of Albemarle. 
William Hardell, **Mayor of the City of London. 
William de Huntingfield, Sheriff of Norfolk and Suffolk.
John de Lacie, Lord of Pontefract Castle. 
William de Lanvallei, Lord of Standway Castle. 
William Malet, Lord of Curry-Mallet, Sheriff of Somerset and Dorset. 
Geoffrey de Mandeville, Earl of Essex and Gloucester. 
William Marshall Jr, heir to the earldom of Pembroke. 
Roger de Montbegon, Lord of Hornby Castle, Lancashire. 
Richard de Montfichet, Baron. 
William de Mowbray, Lord of Axholme. 
Richard de Percy, Baron. 
Saire/Saher de Quincey, Earl of Winchester. 
Robert de Roos, Lord of Hamlake Castle. 
Geoffrey de Saye, Baron. 
Robert de Vere, heir to the earldom of Oxford. 
Eustace de Vesci, Lord of Alnwick Castle.

Descendants of the following non-Surety supporters of the Magna Charta are also candidates for membership in the BOMC: William III d'Aubigny, Hubert de Burgh, Alan of Galloway, William Marshall Sr., and William IV de Warenne.  Membership may also be considered for individuals of good moral character who, while not descended from a surety or non-surety supporter, have an interest in the purposes of the BOMC.

The BOMC maintains a partial list of "gateway" immigrants who descend from Magna Charta Barons.  Many of these individuals and their descendants played significant roles in the history of the United States.  For example, George Washington's family descend from William d'Aubigny, Lord of Belvoir Castle.

Notable Members and Award Recipients

Among others, members of the BOMC have included: Frederick H. Winston, diplomat and founder of the law firm Winston & Strawn; Charles W. Darling, Assistant Secretary of the Navy; William S. Sessions, Federal Judge and Director of the FBI; Hugh Scott, U.S. Senator from Pennsylvania; Dorsey B. Hardeman, influential Texas politician; and, Martin W. Clement, 20th century railroad magnate.  Recipients of the BOMC's Magna Charta Day Award include Sir Winston Churchill, General Douglas MacArthur, President Dwight D. Eisenhower, and Masters of The Rolls of England Lords Donaldson and Woolf.

References 
 BOMC Home Page
The Hereditary Society Community of the United States of America
 Stinson, David V., ed., Magna Charta in America. Baltimore: Gateway Press, Inc., 1993 (a project of the BOMC and the Magna Charta Research Foundation)

Lineage societies
Magna Carta
Charities based in Pennsylvania